Murray Robert Smith (6 June 1941 – 27 September 2009) was a New Zealand politician of the Labour Party.

Biography

Smith was born in Hamilton in 1941. He became a civil servant and later a member of the Whangarei Adult Education Committee.

He joined the Labour Party and was secretary of both the Marsden and Hamilton Labour Representation Committees. He unsuccessfully contested Piako in 1966 finishing third and Marsden in 1969 finishing second.

He was elected for the Whangarei electorate with the swing to Labour in the 1972 general election but was defeated in the next election in 1975. In early 1977 he contemplated standing as a candidate for the Labour Party nomination in the Mangere by-election, however he ultimately decided to withdraw from the candidacy race.

Formerly a Public Trust accountant, he was made managing director of the Development Finance Corporation and executive chairman of New Zealand Railways by Labour. From his time in Parliament, he was a friend of Roger Douglas, and of Michael Bassett who said that his "contribution to New Zealand went well beyond what he managed in three short years to do for the people of Whangarei".

He joined the Baháʼí community in 1989, becoming the chief executive officer in New Zealand in 1991 and deputy secretary-general of the Baháʼí international secretariat in 1994. He died in Raglan on 27 September 2009.

References

Obituary in Dominion Post (Wellington) of 31 October 2009.

External links
 Smith in 2005 (photo)

1941 births
2009 deaths
New Zealand Labour Party MPs
New Zealand Bahá'ís
New Zealand accountants
20th-century New Zealand businesspeople
Deaths from prostate cancer
People from Hamilton, New Zealand
Converts to the Bahá'í Faith
20th-century Bahá'ís
21st-century Bahá'ís
Unsuccessful candidates in the 1975 New Zealand general election
Unsuccessful candidates in the 1969 New Zealand general election
Unsuccessful candidates in the 1966 New Zealand general election
Members of the New Zealand House of Representatives
New Zealand MPs for North Island electorates